Walter Voss may refer to:

 Walter "Tillie" Voss (1897–1975), American football player
 Walter Voss (KPD) (1907–1983), German politician
 Walter Voss (SPD) (1909–1963), German politician

See also 
 Walter Voß